Jana Novotná and Arantxa Sánchez Vicario were the defending champions and won in the final 4–6, 7–5, 6–4 against Rosalyn Nideffer and Pam Shriver.

Seeds
Champion seeds are indicated in bold text while text in italics indicates the round in which those seeds were eliminated.

 Jana Novotná /  Arantxa Sánchez Vicario (champions)
n/a
 Katrina Adams /  Meredith McGrath (semifinals)
 Nicole Arendt /  Manon Bollegraf (first round)

Draw

References

External links
 1996 Direct Line International Championships Doubles draw

Doubles
Doubles 1996